(S)-squalene-2,3-epoxide hydro-lyase may refer to:
 Arabidiol synthase, an enzyme
 Dammarenediol II synthase, an enzyme
 Lupan-3beta,20-diol synthase, an enzyme